Governor Bull may refer to:

Henry Bull (governor) (1610–1694), 12th and 14th Governor of the Colony of Rhode Island and Providence Plantations from 1685 to 1686 and in 1690
William Bull (governor) (1638–1755), 29th Governor of the Province of South Carolina from 1737 to 1743
William Bull II (1710–1791), Acting Governor of the Province of South Carolina on five occasions between 1760 and 1775